Viivi Elina Avellan (born June 3, 1977) is a Finnish journalist and television hosting entrepreneur (Awell Entertainment Oy). She used to work as a sport news hostess for television channel Nelonen. Viivi was the hostess for entertainment news on MTV3 television channel on years 2005 and 2006. She worked as an Editor-in-Chief in a Finnish golf magazine called Fore from 2013 to 2016.

In 2006 Avellan published a book called 'Sinkkunaisen käsikirja' (Handbook for single women). On 2012 her company published an ice hockey themed kid's book Leijona on Kuningas with co-operation of the Finnish Ice Hockey Association.

Since 2016, Avellan has lived in Singapore with her husband (married in 2013) and their two sons. Viivi has set up several companies in Singapore. She is importing Finnish health products to Singapore and is working as a Country Manager at Innovation Home Singapore since 2019.

References

External links
 Official homepage

21st-century Finnish journalists
Living people
1977 births
Finnish expatriates in Singapore
Finnish women journalists